Width is a measure of distance from side to side, measuring across an object at right angles to the length.

Width may also refer to:

Graph theory 
Width of a partial order - the cardinality of a maximum antichain.
 Width of a tree decomposition of an undirected graph, one less the size of the largest vertex-set in the decomposition.
 Width of a path decomposition of an undirected graph, one less than the size of the largest set in the decomposition
 Width of a branch decomposition of an undirected graph, the maximum number of shared vertices of any pair of subgraphs formed by removing an edge from the tree.
 Clique-width of a graph, the minimum number of distinct labels needed to construct G by operations that create a labeled vertex, form the disjoint union of two labeled graphs, add an edge connecting all pairs of vertices with given labels, or relabel all vertices with a given label.
 The width of a graph is an alternative name for the degeneracy of the graph - the smallest k for which every subgraph has degree at most k.
 Bandwidth of a graph - the minimum, over all orderings of vertices of G, of the length of the longest edge (the number of steps in the ordering between its two endpoints).
 Width of a hypergraph -  the size of a smallest subset of edges that meets all other edges.

Programming 
%$WIDTH%, a computer environment variable in DOS Plus

People 
Per Ove Width (born 1939), Norwegian politician

See also
 "The Width of a Circle", a song written by David Bowie in 1969
 
 Wide (disambiguation)